Safari is a 1940 American adventure film directed by Edward H. Griffith and starring Douglas Fairbanks Jr., Madeleine Carroll and Tullio Carminati.

The film's sets were designed by the art directors Hans Dreier and Ernst Fegté.

Plot
Millionaire Baron de Courland arrives in West Africa in order to hunt for big game. He is accompanied by his girlfriend, Linda Stewart.

De Courland hires Jim Logan to be his guide. During the safari, Linda falls for Jim, causing De Courland to be jealous.

Cast
 Douglas Fairbanks Jr. as Jim Logan 
 Madeleine Carroll as Linda Stewart 
 Tullio Carminati as Baron de Courtland 
 Muriel Angelus as Fay Thorne 
 Lynne Overman as Jock McPhail 
 Frederick Vogeding as Captain on Yacht 
 Clinton Rosemondas as Mike 
 Thomas Louden as Doctor Phillips 
 Fred Godoy as Steward 
 Jack Carr as Wemba
 Billy Gilbert as Mondehare 
 Hans von Morhart as Head Quartermaster 
 Darby Jones as Admiral
 Henry Rowland as Steersman

Production
Paramount bought the story in May 1938. In May 1939 they announced Madeline Griffth would star under the direction of Edward Griffith. Her co-star was going to be Joel McCrea who had just signed a two-year contract with Paramount. Another lead role was given to Whitney Bourne who Paramount were grooming for stardom.

The film is based on the life of Beryl Markham. Douglas Fairbanks Jr. recalled that she was offered a part in the picture, and she found the process of filming “scarier than flying the Atlantic solo.”

In July W. P. Lipscomb was reportedly working on the script.

In August Carroll announced she would be getting the boat back from England to start making the film in October. By this stage Douglas Fairbanks Jr had replaced McCrea as her co star.

Second unit footage was shot in Africa.

References

Bibliography
 Kenneth M. Cameron. Africa on Film: Beyond Black and White. Continuum, 1994.

External links

Safari at Letterbox DVD

1940 films
American adventure films
1940 adventure films
1940s English-language films
Films directed by Edward H. Griffith
Films scored by Friedrich Hollaender
Films set in Africa
Paramount Pictures films
American black-and-white films
1940s American films